Framwelgate (or Framwellgate) is an area of Durham, County Durham, England.  It is adjoined by Crossgate, North End, Framwellgate Moor and the River Wear.

The origin of the place-name is from the Old English words fram  and wella together with the Old Norse gata and means street by the strongly gushing spring. It appears as Framwelgat in 1352.

The 'Borough of Framwelgate' grew up following the construction of Framwellgate Bridge over the River Wear by Bishop Flambard in 1121.  The roads Millburngate and Framwelgate became part the main route between Durham and the North.  The area was home to wealthy Durham merchants and artisans until the 17th century.  By the 19th century much of the area had developed into slum housing with coal mining occurring to the north of Framwelgate.  These houses were demolished during the 1930s and residents moved to the newly built Sherburn Road Estate in Gilesgate.

Framwelgate is believed to have been named from a well at the head of the old street.  This was connected to a pant in the Market Place. An honorary Pant Master continues to be appointed to this day.  Above the well the road continues as Framwellgate Peth.

Framwelgate Peth continues towards Dryburn, Durham's place of execution until the construction of Durham Gaol.  Saint John Boste was executed here in 1594 for being a Roman Catholic priest. While name Dryburn is popularly claimed to derive from a stream that dried up following the execution of a Jesuit or a corruption of Tyburn (London's place of execution), Victor Watts has shown the name, deriving from the middle English for 'dry stream' was being used by at least the 14th century.

A mediaeval leper hospital, St. Leonard's is believed to have been sited just south of Dryburn until its demolition in 1652/53.

Prior to the 1974 local government re-organisation the Municipal Borough covering central Durham was styled "The City of Durham and Framwelgate".

References
Margot Johnson. "Framwellgate" in Durham: Historic and University City and surrounding area. Sixth Edition. Turnstone Ventures. 1992. . Pages 12 and 13.
Watts, Victor. A Dictionary of County Durham Place-Names. English Place-Name Society, Nottingham, 2002.

External links
Northern Echo 'Durham Memories' article on Framwelgate 14 March 2003
Northern Echo 'Durham Memories' article on City coalmines 28 March 2003
British History Online article on St Leonard's Hospital
Durham Mining Museum entry for Durham Main Pit (in Framwelgate).

Areas of Durham, England